During the 2005–06 Dutch football season, PSV competed in the Eredivisie.

Season summary
Despite the loss of several key players following their unexpected run to the UEFA Champions League semi-final, PSV secured a second successive Eredivise title. However, they were unable to defend the KNVB Cup, losing to Ajax in the final, and were knocked out in the Champions League first knockout round by Lyon.

At the end of the season, manager Guus Hiddink, who had concurrently managed the Australia national team, left to manage the Russia national team. He was succeeded as PSV manager by Ronald Koeman.

Squad
Squad at end of season

Left club during season

Starting 11
Considering starts in all competitions

Transfers

In
 Lee Nguyen – Indiana Hoosiers
 Arouna Koné – Roda JC, loan
 Michael Ball – Rangers
 Archie Thompson – Melbourne Victory, loan
 Juan Carlos Carrizo – San Lorenzo
 Mika Väyrynen – Heerenveen

Out
 Leandro – Porto
 Remco van der Schaaf – Vitesse
 Johann Vogel – Milan
 Wilfred Bouma – Aston Villa
 Kasper Bøgelund
 Johan Vonlanthen
 Lee Young-pyo – Tottenham Hotspur
 Park Ji-sung - Manchester United
 Mark van Bommel – Barcelona, free
 Robert – Real Betis, loan

References

PSV Eindhoven seasons
Psv Eindhoven
Dutch football championship-winning seasons